Hindi, or Modern Standard Hindi, is a standardised register of the Hindustani language that serves as one of the two official languages of India.

Hindi may also have the following broader meanings:
 In a slightly broader sense, Hindi is the Hindustani language, the lingua franca of northern India and Pakistan which has both Modern Standard Hindi and Urdu as its literary registers (see first map)
In an intermediate sense, Hindi refers to the Central Indo-Aryan languages, which include Hindustani along with Awadhi, Braj and others (see second map)
In the widest sense, Hindi covers the languages of the Hindi Belt, which in addition to the Central Indo-Aryan languages has variously been taken to also include varieties of Bihari, Rajasthani, and Pahari (see map at the end)

In other specific contexts, Hindi may also refer to:
 Bombay Hindi, a Hindustani-based pidgin spoken in Mumbai
 Fiji Hindi
 Caribbean Hindustani
 The Turkish term for turkey (bird)

People with the name 
 Abdulbasit Hindi (born 1997), Saudi Arabian football player
 Abdul-Ghaffar Hasan Al-Hindi (1913–2007), Pakistani scholar
 Ahmad Hindi (1800–1869), Iranian cleric
 Ahmad Hindi (athlete) (born 1995), Jordanian Paralympic athlete
 Amin al-Hindi (1940–2010), Palestinian intelligence chief
 Ayman Al-Hindi (born 1986), Palestinian football player
 Baba Ratan Hindi, legendary figure of early Islam
 Hanadi Zakaria al-Hindi (born 1978), Saudi Arabian pilot
 Hani al-Hindi (1927–2016), Syrian politician and activist
 Ibrahim Bu Hindi (born 1948), Bahraini journalist and writer
 Ignatius Simon II Hindi Zora (1754–1838), Syrian patriarch
 Joseph V Augustine Hindi (18th–19th c.), Chaldean Catholic patriarch
 Al-Muttaqi al-Hindi (1472–1567), Islamic scholar
 Nadia Al-Hindi (born 1972), Jordanian tennis player
 Safi al-Din al-Hindi, 13th-century scholar
 Steve Hindi (born 1950s), American activisit and businessman
 Wael El Hindi (born 1980), Egyptian squash player
 Yahya El Hindi (born 1998), Lebanese football player
 Hindi Zahra (born 1979), Moroccan singer and actress

See also
 
 Hind (disambiguation)
 Hindustan (disambiguation)
 Hindustani (disambiguation)
 Hindi literature
 Hindi cinema